The 1983 Meghalaya Legislative Assembly election was held on 17 February 1983. No party secured a majority of seats and no women were elected.  A coalition named the Meghalaya United Parliamentary Party was formed by the All Party Hill Leaders Conference (AHL), the Hill State People's Democratic Party, the Public Demands Implementation Convention (PDIC) and two independent members.  On 2 March 1983 the coalition presented B. B. Lyngdoh from AHL as Chief Minister.  However, the coalition only lasted 29 days and on 2 April a new coalition, the Meghalaya Democratic Forum, was formed with the Indian National Congress (INC) in the lead.  W. A. Sangma of the INC was appointed Chief Minister.

Results 

In the 1978 election, two candidates from the PDIC were elected, but the party had not obtained registration in time for the election; at that time, the party's representatives were recorded as independents in the official results.

Does not include the two PDIC candidates elected as independents in 1978.

Elected Members

References 

Meghalaya
State Assembly elections in Meghalaya